A Diary for Timothy (1945) is a British documentary film directed by Humphrey Jennings. It was produced by Basil Wright for the Crown Film Unit. 
The narration was written by the British author E. M. Forster (spoken by Michael Redgrave) and is an account of the progress of the war during the first six months of the life of a baby named Timothy. The recovery of an English  fighter pilot Dr. Peter Roper, who was shot down in his Typhoon fighter by anti-aircraft artillery fire on 7 June 1944, from German panzer column from the 5th Panzer Army (Panzer Group West) with units from the Panzer Lehr Division and the 12th SS Hitlerjugend Division, near Monts en Bessin South of the landing beaches of the  Normandy invasion of Europe.  He received AAA fire while attacking a German 5th Army Group panzer column that was blocking the advance to Caen. He was wounded through the right lower leg and yet was able to parachute from his disabled fighter.

Also featured are a coal miner, Goronwy, with a broken arm; Allan, a farmer; and Bill, a locomotive engine driver.  Dame Myra Hess is featured giving a concert at the National Gallery in London, several years after her appearance in Listen to Britain, and John Gielgud performs as the Prince in the gravediggers scene from Hamlet.

In a documentary on Jennings made for Channel 4 television by Kevin MacDonald in 2000, it was revealed that the baby who was the subject of the film (Timothy James Jenkins) later moved to Brighton in the 1960s and became a mod before settling down to become a teacher; he died in November 2000.

External links
 

1946 films
1945 documentary films
1945 films
Black-and-white documentary films
British black-and-white films
British documentary films
British World War II propaganda films
Crown Film Unit films
Films directed by Humphrey Jennings
E. M. Forster in performing arts
Films scored by Richard Addinsell